George Savage (5 December 1895 – 1968) was an English professional footballer who played as a left half. He made appearances in the English Football League with West Bromwich Albion and Wrexham, the latter of which he made over 100 appearances with. He also played non-league football for Willenhall Swifts, Shrewsbury Town, Alfreton Town and Cradley Heath.

References

1895 births
1968 deaths
English footballers
Association football midfielders
English Football League players
Willenhall F.C. players
West Bromwich Albion F.C. players
Wrexham A.F.C. players
Shrewsbury Town F.C. players
Alfreton Town F.C. players
Cradley Heath F.C. players